Narciso "Ciso" Platero Abeyta, or Ha So Deh (1918–1998) was a Navajo painter, silversmith and Navajo code talker. He is known for his colorful paintings depicting Navajo life. His work is in the permanent collection of museums including the Smithsonian National Museum of the American Indian.

Early life and education
Abeyta was born in 1918. He is named after his father, Narciso. His mother was Pablita. He started drawing when he was eleven. He attended the Santa Fe Indian School, starting in 1939. Dorothy Dunn was his teacher. Abeyta was a Golden Gloves boxer. He served in World War II in the United States Army, as a code talker. After he returned from service, he was unable to work for ten years due to his experiences at war. Eventually, he attended the University of New Mexico. He trained under Raymond Jonson.

Mid-life and career

Abeyta was primarily a painter. His paintings document Navajo life, and use brush stroke techniques that are reminiscent of Navajo rugs. He had two known commissions for work as a muralist; a 1934 mural for a social science classroom in Santa Fe, New Mexico and in 1939 for Maisel's Indian Trading Post in Albuquerque, New Mexico. He demonstrated painting at the 1939 San Francisco World's Fair

Abeyta married Sylvia Ann, a Quaker ceramics artist. They had seven children, including artists Tony Abeyta and Pablita Abeyta. The family lived in Gallup, New Mexico.

Later life and legacy

Abeyta died in June 22, 1998 from a cerebral hemorrhage.

His work is held in the collections of the National Gallery of Art, National Museum of the American Indian, and the Museum of New Mexico.

Abeyta's paintings were included the book, Southwest Indian Painting: A Changing Art (1957, University of Arizona Press) by Clara Lee Tanner.

Major exhibitions

1994 –Translating Navajo Worlds: the Art of Narciso (Ha-So-De) and Tony Abeyta, Wheelwright Museum of the American Indian, Santa Fe, New Mexico

References

External links 
 Narciso Abetya artwork at the Smithsonial National Museum of the American Indian

1918 births
1998 deaths
20th-century American painters
American male painters
Native American painters
Navajo code talkers
Artists from Santa Fe, New Mexico
Military personnel from New Mexico
University of New Mexico alumni
Native American male artists
20th-century Native Americans
20th-century American male artists